UBOS may refer to:
Ultimate Book of Spells,  a Canadian animated television series
Uganda Bureau of Statistics, a government agency